Sublette Municipal Airport  is a city-owned, public-use airport located one nautical mile (2 km) northeast of the central business district of Sublette, a city in Haskell County, Kansas, United States. It was formerly known as Sublette Flying Club Airport.

Facilities and aircraft 
Sublette Municipal Airport covers an area of 18 acres (7 ha) at an elevation of 2,911 feet (887 m) above mean sea level. It has two runways: 17/35 is 4,498 by 60 feet (1,371 x 18 m) with an asphalt surface and 8/26 is 2,300 by 100 feet (701 x 30 m) with a turf surface. For the 12-month period ending July 19, 2011, the airport had 600 general aviation aircraft operations, an average of 50 per month.

References

External links 
 Sublette Flying Club Airport at Kansas DOT Airport Directory
 Aerial image as of September 1991 from USGS The National Map
 

Airports in Kansas
Haskell County, Kansas